Ricaldone is a comune (municipality) in the Province of Alessandria in the Italian region Piedmont, located about  southeast of Turin and about  southwest of Alessandria.

Ricaldone borders the following municipalities: Acqui Terme, Alice Bel Colle, Cassine, Maranzana, Mombaruzzo, Quaranti, and Strevi.

Demographic evolution

References

Cities and towns in Piedmont